Colin Long (born June 19, 1989) is an American professional ice hockey center who is currently playing for the Adirondack Thunder in the ECHL. He was drafted by the Phoenix Coyotes in the fourth round of the 2008 NHL Entry Draft, 99th overall.

Playing career
Long began his major junior career with the Kelowna Rockets of the WHL in 2005–06. After a 31-goal, 100-point campaign in his third season with the Rockets in 2007–08, he was named to the WHL East First All-Star Team. In the off-season, he was drafted by the Phoenix Coyotes in the fourth round, 99th overall, in the 2008 NHL Entry Draft. Late in his fourth season with the Rockets, he was named WHL Player of the Week on March 9, 2009, after recording 7 points in 3 games. Long was named captain for the Kelowna Rockets for the 2008-2009 Season and led them to winning the WHL championship.

Prior to the 2009–10 season, Long turned professional by signing a three-year entry level contract with the Phoenix Coyotes on October 1, 2009, worth $700,000 per year. He was then assigned to AHL affiliate, the San Antonio Rampage, recording only four points in 29 games before suffering a season-ending head injury in January.

After three injury affected seasons within the Coyotes organization, Long was not tendered a new contract and signed a one-year deal with Düsseldorfer EG of the Deutsche Eishockey Liga on June 20, 2012. Having not recovered from injury, he became a player-coach for DEG until medically cleared to play. After being medically cleared to play, Long proceeded to suit up for Düsseldorfer EG until 2014. On April 4, Long signed a 2-year Contract with the Krefeld Pinguine of the Deutsche Eishockey Liga. After one season with the Pinguine, Long left Krefeld and signed in Allsvenskan League in Sweden with Asplöven HC on July 14, 2015. After recording 21 points in 40 games, Long signed for Asiago Hockey 1935 of the Alps Hockey League on August 1, 2016, recording 42 points in just 29 games. Long then went on to play for HC Gherdëina of the Alps Hockey League for 2 seasons. On May 22, 2019, Long signed with EHC Lustenau of the Alps Hockey League.

After a lone season continuing in the AlpsHL with EHC Lustenau, Long returned to North American after 8 European seasons and sat out the pandemic shortened 2020–21 season. On July 16, 2021, Long returned to the professional circuit in signing a one-year contract with the ECHL with the Adirondack Thunder.

Career statistics

Awards and honors

References

External links

1989 births
Living people
Adirondack Thunder players
American men's ice hockey centers
Arizona Coyotes draft picks
Asiago Hockey 1935 players
Asplöven HC players
Düsseldorfer EG players
HC Gardena players
Ice hockey players from California
Kelowna Rockets players
Krefeld Pinguine players
Las Vegas Wranglers players
Portland Pirates players
San Antonio Rampage players
Sportspeople from Santa Ana, California